Marisora falconensis is a species of skink found in Venezuela and Colombia.

References

Marisora
Reptiles described in 1997
Taxa named by Abraham Mijares-Urrutia